László Kovács ASC (14 May 1933 – 22 July 2007) was a Hungarian-American cinematographer who was influential in the development of American New Wave films in the 1970s, collaborating with directors like Peter Bogdanovich, Richard Rush, Dennis Hopper, Norman Jewison, and Martin Scorsese. Known for his work on Easy Rider (1969) and Five Easy Pieces (1970), Kovács was the recipient of numerous awards, including three Lifetime Achievement Awards. He was an active member of the American Society of Cinematographers and was member of the organization's board of directors.

Early life
Born in Cece, Hungary to Julianna and Imre Kovács, Kovács studied cinema at the Academy of Drama and Film in Budapest between 1952 and 1956. Together with Vilmos Zsigmond, a fellow student and lifelong friend, Kovács secretly filmed the day-to-day development of the Hungarian Revolution of 1956 on black and white 35mm movie film, using an Arriflex camera borrowed from their school. By that time, however, the revolution was no longer considered newsworthy and it was not until some years later, in 1961, that it was screened on the CBS television network, in a documentary narrated by Walter Cronkite.

Kovács decided to settle in the United States, becoming a naturalized citizen in 1963. He worked at several manual labor jobs, including making maple syrup and printing microfilm documents in an insurance office, before making several "no-budget" and "low-budget" films with Vilmos Zsigmond, including The Incredibly Strange Creatures Who Stopped Living and Became Mixed-Up Zombies. At the time Kovács would be credited as Leslie Kovacs and Zsigmond as William Zsigmond.

Film career
Kovács' breakthrough came with the 1969 film Easy Rider, starring and directed by Dennis Hopper. Kovács was reluctant to work on this film at first, having already worked on a number of B movie biker films, such as Hells Angels on Wheels. Hopper ultimately convinced Kovács that this film would be different and Kovács signed on as the film's director of photography. He earned second place for the Best Cinematographer Golden Laurel at the 1970 Laurel Awards. In 1970, he again worked with Hopper on the film The Last Movie. That same year, Kovács filmed Five Easy Pieces, for which he received the third place Golden Laurel for Best Cinematographer.

Kovács filmed more than 70 motion pictures. Among these were six films for director Peter Bogdanovich: Targets, What's Up, Doc?, Paper Moon, At Long Last Love, Nickelodeon, and Mask. Bogdanovich worked with Kovács more times than any other cinematographer.

Other notable films Kovács photographed include For Pete's Sake, Shampoo, New York, New York, Ghostbusters, Ruby Cairo, Say Anything..., Radio Flyer, My Best Friend's Wedding, and Miss Congeniality. He also did additional photography on Close Encounters of the Third Kind and The Last Waltz.

When working on The Last Waltz, camera operators were instructed to turn their cameras off at different intervals, in order to save battery life. One of these instances was during Muddy Waters' set, but Waters' outstanding performance led director Martin Scorsese to spontaneously change his mind, and ordered all cameras to be turned on. Because the cameras took several minutes to fully warm up, most caught only the last few bars of Waters' performance. Kovács, however, either did not hear or disregarded orders to shut down his camera, and was the only cameraperson on set who managed to film Waters' entire performance.

Kovács' final work appears in Torn from the Flag, a 2006 feature documentary about the 1956 Hungarian Revolution which incorporates original footage he and Zsigmond shot as film students before fleeing to the United States.

Personal life and death
On July 22, 2007, Kovács died of pancreatic cancer at his home in Beverly Hills, California at the age of 74. At the time of his death, Kovács had been married for 23 years to his wife, Audrey. He had two daughters, Julianna and Nadia, and a granddaughter, Mia.

Awards and honors
In 1995 he was a member of the jury at the 19th Moscow International Film Festival.

Kovács was honored with Lifetime Achievement Awards from Camerimage (1998), WorldFest (1999), and the American Society of Cinematographers (2002). The Lifetime Achievement Award from the ASC is the organization's highest honor. In addition, Kovács received an Excellence in Cinematography Award from the 1999 Hawaii International Film Festival and a Hollywood Film Award at the 2001 Hollywood Film Festival.

The American Society of Cinematographers dedicated the 2008 Heritage Award for top student filmmakers in memory of Kovács.

The 2008 documentary film No Subtitles Necessary: Laszlo & Vilmos explores the 50-year friendship between Kovács and Zsigmond and their influence on filmmaking. Film critic Leonard Maltin said that, without Kovács and fellow cinematographer Zsigmond, "the American New Wave of the late 1960s and early '70s wouldn’t have flowered as it did."

Filmography

References

External links

Brief biography and credits
 László Kovács' work on Easy Rider
Giardina, Carolyn. (2007)  Cinematographer Laszlo Kovacs dies at 74   The Hollywood Reporter
László Kovács at the Internet Encyclopedia of Cinematographers
International Cinematographers' Guild Biography
No Subtitles Necessary: Laszlo & Vilmos. Independent Lens, PBS broadcast November 17, 2009.

1933 births
2007 deaths
Hungarian cinematographers
Hungarian emigrants to the United States
American cinematographers
People from Fejér County
Deaths from pancreatic cancer